The Wadi Daliyeh (وادي دالية) is a wadi in the West Bank, located fourteen kilometres north of Jericho, flowing east from the Samarian hills down to the Jordan Valley. The valley has caves containing archaeological material.

Archaeological discoveries

Mughâret Abū Shinjeh 
In 1962 and 1963, Frank Moore Cross, a professor of Hebrew at Harvard University, purchased a hoard of ancient papyri and stamp seals from looters from the Bedouin tribe of Ta'amireh. The purchase also included a few coins and two gold rings. As part of the deal, the looterl revealed the place where from where the artifacts were looted. They lead him to Mughâret Abū Shinjeh cave and in 1963-1964, Cross conducted excavations at the site in the and unearthed more papyri along with stamp seals, some still intact, and various human remains. The papyri are written in Aramaic and dated to the end of Achaemenid rule over Samaria. The material of the site was understood as the remains of noble Samaritans who had fled from the reprisals of Alexander the Great in 331 BCE, following the murder of his satrap Andromachus.

In the wadi were discovered 18 partially legible Aramaic legal papyri and clay seals inscriptions from the 4th BCE, during the reigns of Artaxerses and Artaxerses II. These were excavated in 1963 and the papyri are now housed in the Rockefeller Museum in Jerusalem. The contents of the documents include the deeds for the sale of slaves. The most recent studies are: Wadi Daliyeh II: the Samaria papyri from Wadi Daliyeh by Douglas Marvin Gropp, pp. 1–116 in DJD XXVIII (2001); The Wadi Daliyeh Seal Impressions Vol.1 by Mary Joan Winn Leith(Oxford, 1997); and "Les manuscrits araméens du Wadi Daliyeh et la Samarie vers 450–332 av. J.-C." by Jan Dušek (Leiden: Brill, 2007).

Iraq en-Na'sana 
During the second season of the British excavations in Wadi Daliyeh, the cave of Iraq en-Na'sana was excavated. It contained material from the Intermediate Bronze Age (2500-2000 BCE) and from the time of the Bar Kokhba revolt in the early 2nd century CE. The cave is the northernmost of the refuge caves of the rebels.

References

Archaeological sites in Israel
Aramaic papyri